Abgar usually refers to Abgar V, the King of Osroene with his capital at Edessa, ruled 4 BC-40 AD.

Abgar may also refer to:

Kings of Osroene 
Abgar II (ruled 68–53 BC)
Abgar VIII (ruled 167–177 AD)
Abgar IX (ruled 177–212 AD)

Other uses 
Abgar Ali Akbar Armani (died after 27 January 1708), Armenian of the Safavid Empire
Abgar Barsom (September 4, 1977 -), Swedish footballer
Diana Abgar (Apgar) (1859–1937), Armenian writer and diplomat